Helwingia chinensis is a plant species first described by Alexander Theodorowicz Batalin. Helwingia chinensis is part of the genus Helwingia and the family Helwingiaceae.

It was collected and brought to the United States by Daniel J. Hinkley as part of his expedition to China's Sichuan Province in 1996.

Varieties
Helwingia chinesis var. crenata.

References

Aquifoliales